Kalas may refer to:

Places
Kalas, Karnataka, a village in India
Kalas, Parner, a village in Maharashtra, India
Madu Kalas, a village in Pakistan
Uttar Kalas, a town in West Bengal, India
Kalas, Iran, a village in East Azerbaijan Province, Iran
Galați (Turkish: Kalas), Romania

Other uses
 Kalas (surname)
 Kalas (band) (formerly Scum Angel), American psychedelic-metal band based in Bay Area
 Kalas, protagonist of the video game Baten Kaitos: Eternal Wings and the Lost Ocean

See also
 
120349 Kalas, a main-belt minor planet
Mount Kailash, a peak in the Kailas Range (Gangdisê Mountains), which are part of the Transhimalaya in Tibet
Kalasha, a metal pot used in Hindu rites
Kallas, an Estonian surname
Kala (disambiguation)
Kalach (disambiguation)
Kalash (disambiguation)
Kalla (disambiguation)
Callas (disambiguation)